The Giardino Botanico Alpino di Passo Coe is a municipal nature preserve and alpine botanical garden located at an elevation of 1612 meters on Monte Marònia in Passo Coe, about 5 km southeast of Folgaria, Trentino, Italy. It is managed by the Museo Civico Rovereto, and open Tuesdays through Sundays in the warmer months.

The garden contains alpine plants and flowers, in an alpine landscape of pasture, pond, and trees. It also includes collections useful plants and medicinal plants.

See also 
 List of botanical gardens in Italy

References 
 Giardino Botanico Alpino di Passo Coe
 Comune di Folgaria (Italian)
 Museo Civico Rovereto (Italian)
 L'Italia dei giardini, Touring club italiano, Touring Editore, 2005, page 53. .

Botanical gardens in Italy
Gardens in Trentino-Alto Adige/Südtirol